Hyung-Taik Lee was the defending champion but did not compete that year.

Lleyton Hewitt won the final 4–3 after Carlos Moyá was forced to retire.

Seeds
A champion seed is indicated in bold text while text in italics indicates the round in which that seed was eliminated.

  Juan Carlos Ferrero (first round)
  Rainer Schüttler (first round)
  Carlos Moyá (final)
  Mark Philippoussis (quarterfinals)
  Paradorn Srichaphan (second round)
  Nicolás Massú (first round)
  Lleyton Hewitt (champion)
  Martin Verkerk (semifinals)

Draw

External links
 2004 Adidas International Draw
 2004 Adidas International Singles Qualifying Draw

Men's Singles
Singles